Erebuni Sport Club, was an Armenian football club based in the capital Yerevan. Founded as a football school for young players in 2007, the club entered the Armenian football league system in 2016.

History

In 2007, the club was founded as a youth football school under the ownership of Tigran Ayvazyan, based in the Erebuni District of Yerevan.

In June 2016, it was announced that the club was revived on the basis of the Erebuni football school located in the Erebuni District of Yerevan. The club made its debut in the 2016–17 Armenian First League season.

On 28 February 2019, the FFA suspended the rights of Erebuni to continue competing in the second part of the 2018-19 Armenian First League and the club was expelled from the competition, plus a fine of AMD 500,000.

Current squad

References

External links
 RSSSF Armenia (and subpages per year)

Erebuni
2007 establishments in Armenia
Association football clubs established in 2007